Saling Creek is a stream in Audrain, Boone  and
Monroe counties in the U.S. state of Missouri. It is a tributary of Reese Fork.

The stream meanders  to the east passing south of the town of Sturgeon and turning north through the east side of that community. The stream passes under Missouri Route 22 and into Audrain County just north of Sturgeon. The stream flows generally north through the west portion of Audrain County roughly parallel to and west of Missouri Route 151. The stream enters Monroe County and within just a few feet enters Reese Fork.

Saling Creek was named after George Saling, a pioneer settler.

See also
List of rivers of Missouri

References

Rivers of Audrain County, Missouri
Rivers of Boone County, Missouri
Rivers of Monroe County, Missouri
Rivers of Missouri